Sultan Sugulle Ainanshe was the first Sultan of the Habr Yunis and the founder of the Habr Yunis Sultanate.

Biography
The Habr Yunis Sultanate broke off from the Isaaq Sultanate during the reign of Sultan Farah Guled. The first Habr Yunis chief to assume the title Sultan was Sugulleh Ainanshe of the Ismail Arrah clan, son of Ainanshe, a traditional chief. 

The sultanate inherited the profitable trade routes leading into the Sheikh mountains and Burao from the Isaaq Sultanate and reached a pinnacle under Sultan Hersi Aman before being engulfed in civil wars after his considerable power caused a rebellion to break out in the late 1870s. Sugulleh was succeeded by his son Diriyeh Sugule in the mid 19th century who had his capital at Wadhan

See also
Somali aristocratic and court titles

References

Sunni monarchs
18th-century Somalian people
19th-century Somalian people
Somali sultans
Somalian Sunni Muslims
Year of birth missing